Basquiat refers to:
 Jean-Michel Basquiat (1960–1988), American artist
Basquiat (film), a 1996 American biographical film
Basquiat: A Quick Killing in Art, a 1998 biography 
Jean-Michel Basquiat: The Radiant Child, a 2010 documentary film 
Basquiat: Rage to Riches, a 2017 documentary film 
"Basquiat" (song), a 2020 song by South Korean band Pentagon